1962 college football season may refer to:

 1962 NCAA University Division football season
 1962 NCAA College Division football season
 1962 NAIA football season